Andy Sophie (born 26 June 1987) is a Mauritian football player who currently plays for SS Saint-Louisienne in the Réunion Premier League and for the Mauritius national football team as a forward.

International career

International goals
Scores and results list Mauritius' goal tally first.

References

References 

1987 births
Living people
Mauritius international footballers
Mauritian footballers
Mauritian expatriate footballers
Expatriate footballers in Réunion
La Tamponnaise players
JS Saint-Pierroise players
US Sainte-Marienne players
Pamplemousses SC players
Association football forwards
SS Saint-Louisienne players
Mauritian expatriate sportspeople in Réunion